is a fictional character created by Tsuji Santa for the Japanese computer and video game software company Nitroplus, first appearing as a mascot for a Nitroplus-sponsored music festival in 2006. Nitroplus has since developed the character into a media franchise that includes music products, manga series, computer and video games, toy figurines and other merchandise. An anime television series by White Fox based on the character aired in Japan between January and March 2014.

Characters

Super Sonico

Super Sonico is a fictional character created by Tsuji Santa of Nitroplus. Her debut appearance was on October 14, 2006 as the mascot for Nitroplus' annual live music festival event "Nitro Super Sonico", which took place at Shiba Park in Minato-KU. Nitroplus was initially focused on computer games based on visual novels, but every year since 2000 they have also held a music festival.

Sonico appears in the various media as an eighteen-year-old college student. She is depicted as an attractive young adult woman with light peach skin, large red eyes, and straight light pink hair. She keeps her hair long in back and in the front it covers her forehead, around her eyes, down to the bridge of her nose. She is always shown wearing her signature headphones on her head. Her depictions show much variation in her facial features and body proportions between the different artists, while always keeping her trademark traits; headphones, pink hair color and large bust. She also appears as a popular gravure idol as well as the vocalist and guitarist of the fictional band . Sonico also studies marine biology at Musasaka University and lives in Mushashino-shi, Tokyo. She is prone to sleep in a lot, often requiring help to wake up, and her favorite foods are macarons, and her bandmates refer to her as "Nico".

Sonico plays a heritage cherry red Gibson SG electric guitar with a batwing pickguard and black pickup covers named "Daydream."  An older piece of official art incorrectly shows the guitar with a Gretsch logo on the headstock.

Associated characters

The young female founder and bassist of the band First Astronomical Velocity. She has light green eyes and straight, long black hair. She is of average height and build, but appears thin next to Fuuri and Sonico. She is often seen wearing a pink nurse's uniform and often attempts to dress up Sonico in dubious outfits.

The young female drummer of the First Astronomical Velocity band. She has a full figure, violet eyes and short wavy brown hair. She is shy, good natured and is usually seen either eating or sleeping when not playing in the band. She and Suzu first appeared in Nitroplus' 2010 visual novel computer game Axanael.

Sonico's manager, a tall man with orange-yellow flame-styled hair and always wearing a hannya mask and carrying a katana on his back, under his coat. He is particularly protective of Sonico, ready to strike at anyone threatening or attempting something inappropriate with her. When not defending Sonico, he is friendly. Despite his demon mask, he is sociable, talkative and actively seeks modeling work for Sonico, sometimes over-committing her.

Nitroplus's former mascot, who is seen in the Super Sonico Animation. Ouka serves as Sonico's co-worker at the modeling agency. She is a tween-age girl, of short stature and slight build. She has short orange hair, her right eye color is orange and she wears a riveted brown leather eye patch over her left eye. She wears a frilled tiara on her head, with grooved silver disks that cover her ears. She is confident, extroverted and constantly looking for her spot in the limelight. However, she is inexperienced with handling clients, and unlike Sonico, she does not have a protective manager, and so she often ends up in bad predicaments.

Toys
A popular and extensive line of PVC figurines of Super Sonico has been produced for Nitroplus by well-known toy designers including, among many others, Max Factory, FREEing, Orchid Seed and Hobby Japan. Figurine styles have included the highly stylized Chibi, Nendoroid and Figma designs in addition to the more realistic designs drawn directly from the character as she appears in games, manga and anime. Sizes have ranged from 1/8 to 1/2 the size of the young adult woman character as she appears in the media. Action figures have also been produced.

Media

Music CDs
To date, there have been six singles and three albums released featuring Sonico.

Singles
SUPERORBITAL (released November 24, 2010; GRN-021): First studio single and first theme song for the PC game SoniComi.
: Second single introduced at the 2010 Summer Comiket, also as an insert song from the Adult PC game Axanael by Nitroplus.
: Solo single sold on the iTunes Store and Amazon MP3 to raise revenue for earthquake relief following the 2011 Tōhoku earthquake and tsunami.
: Third single released in collaboration with Earth Star Entertainment's Comic Earth Star, as the theme song of the magazine. The single was used to collect aid funds for earthquake relief.
VISION (released July 29, 2011; GRN-027): Fourth single as the second theme song to SoniComi.
: Debut solo single. The single included an additional costume patch for the PC game SoniComi on the CD-ROM.

Albums
GALAXY ONE (released November 11, 2011; GRN-028): First studio album.
Love & II+ (released June 27, 2012; GRN-030): First Cosmic Velocity's 2nd album that contains three discs with Love＆II+ LIVE gokko!, Love&II+, and SoniComi: Communication with Sonico Original Soundtrack.
SONICONICOROCK Tribute to VOCALOID: Third studio album containing vocal covers of assorted Vocaloid songs.

Manga
A 4koma manga series by Chika Nonohara titled Super Sonico SoniKoma began serialisation on March 12, 2011 in Comic Earth Star. Another manga series titled Sonicomi with art by Imusanjo serialised in the Monthly Comic Blade. A 4koma manga series titled  has also been featured in Enterbrain's MAGI-CU Comics.

Games

SoniComi (2011/2016, PC)
 is a computer game for Microsoft Windows released on November 25, 2011, developed by Nitroplus and published by Nitroplus and Enterbrain. As a visual novel game, the player takes the role of Sonico's cameraman. The game features events where the player is able to take gravure photographs of her. A PlayStation 3 adaptation with improved visuals, titled , was released on March 20, 2014. The PS3 version received a Famitsu score of 30/40. The game was released worldwide with English translation by JAST USA through Steam featuring dubbed voice by Jessica Nigri.

SoniPro (2014, 3DS)
 is a game developed by Nitroplus and Imageepoch for the Nintendo 3DS announced during the 2013 Wonder Festival. As an idol-producing game, the player takes the role of Sonico's producer, who aims to train her to become an idol. The game was released on July 31, 2014.

Famitsu gave SoniPro a review score of 30/40.

Appearances in other games
Sonico has made cameo appearances in various games, including Le Ciel Bleu, the visual novel Lovesick Puppies, the Japanese online games Web Knight Carnival, Mechanical Girl War Z, Dragon League, Dungeons Lord, Momoiro Daisen Pylon and Blue Sky Dragon Guild, and will be a playable character in Super Heroine Chronicle. Sonico appears as a character within the eroge Axanael developed by Nitroplus. She also appears in Square Enix's Kaku-San-Sei Million Arthur between March 11 and March 23, 2014. Super Sonico and Ōka appear in the Nitroplus Blasterz: Heroines Infinite Duel fighting game, appearing as a support character in the arcade version and as a playable character in the console version, while the latter playable in all versions. Sonico also appeared in Senran Kagura: Peach Beach Splash as one of the DLC characters along with the three characters from Koei Tecmo/Team Ninja's Dead or Alive series, four characters from a manga Ikki Tousen, two characters from Valkyrie Drive and the titular character of Idea Factory’s Hyperdimension Neptunia.

Anime
An anime television series titled  was announced at the Nitro Super Sonic 2013 event held at the Tokyo International Forum. Produced by White Fox, the 12-episode series aired in Japan between January 6, 2014 and March 24, 2014 and was simulcast by Crunchyroll. A DVD and Blu-ray release of the TV series in Japan was announced for March 19, 2014. Sentai Filmworks have licensed the series in North America and will release it on Blu-ray Disc and DVD on May 26, 2015. The Anime Network began streaming the series February 6, 2014. MVM Films have licensed the series in the United Kingdom. In Australia and New Zealand, Hanabee licensed the series within the region.

The opening theme for episode one is "Beat Goes On" by Ayano Yamamoto, whilst a different ending theme, each performed by First Astronomical Velocity (Yamamoto, Mai Goto, and Mami Ozaki), is featured in each episode.

Episode list

Other media
Gravure books featuring Sonico were released by Enterbrain on July 7, 2011. An internet radio show, began broadcasting on March 24, 2011. A Sonico-themed non-game networking software application for iOS has also been released.

Endorsements
Sonico was used to promote the International Exhibition Center station of the Tokyo Waterfront Area Rapid Transit Rinkai Line. She is also being used to promote the  brand of beer from Nara Prefecture, as a collaboration based on the similar-sounding name. Sonico was also the mascot for the 2013 Anitamasai Convention in Saitama.

The Super Sonico Tab is a special edition ASUS MeMo Pad ME172v tablet computer featuring an artwork of Sonico on the rear of the device.

Notes

References

External links
  
 Super Sonico Official YouTube Channel
 Nitroplus Official Homepage 
 Super Sonico The Animation official page 
 Super Sonico (sonico_macaron) on Twitter 
 "SoniCommu" portal at Dengeki Online  
 Daiichi Uchū Sokudo Official Site 
 Virtual Idol Uprising? 
 
 Sonicomi Official English Site

2011 manga
2011 video games
2014 anime television series debuts
2014 video games
AT-X (TV network) original programming
Earth Star Entertainment manga
Enterbrain manga
Female characters in anime and manga
Female characters in advertising
Fictional singers
Japan-exclusive video games
Mag Garden manga
Mascots introduced in 2006
Music in anime and manga
Nintendo 3DS games
Nitroplus
PlayStation 3 games
Sentai Filmworks
Shōnen manga
Television shows written by Yōsuke Kuroda
Tokyo MX original programming
Video games developed in Japan
VTubers
White Fox
Windows games
Yonkoma